The Minnesota Public Television Association (MPTA), also commonly known as Minnesota Public Television, is a not-for-profit trade organization of public television stations in the state of Minnesota that operates an interconnecting statewide educational television network serving residents of Minnesota. The MPTA network is two-way; distributing programming to and from each member station.  It also tries to keep state funding for public television in the Minnesota budget.

Member stations, in addition to Twin Cities Public Television, include Pioneer Public Television serving Appleton and Worthington, KSMQ in Austin, Lakeland Public Television serving Bemidji and Brainerd, WDSE serving Duluth and Hibbing, and North Dakota-based Prairie Public Television, whose stations KFME Fargo, KGFE Grand Forks and KCGE Crookston/Grand Forks serve the northwestern part of Minnesota.

Mass media in Minnesota
Television networks in the United States
Public television in the United States
Non-profit organizations based in Minnesota